Borovskoye is a rural locality (a selo) and the administrative center of Borovsky Selsoviet, Aleysky District, Altai Krai, Russia. The population was 992 as of 2013. There are 17 streets.

Geography 
Borovskoye is located 50 km northwest of Aleysk (the district's administrative centre) by road. Kostin Log is the nearest rural locality.

References 

Rural localities in Aleysky District